The Märkische D.I was a prototype single-seat fighter biplane built in the last months of World War I.

Development
The Märkische Flugzeugwerke was formed in 1916 to repair aircraft and train pilots. It also license-built other German aircraft prolificly during WWI. In 1918, Wilhelm Hillman joined the company from Schütte-Lanz to design a new single-seat fighter, the Märkische D.I. The first D.I prototype was built to participate in the First Fighter Competition at Adlershof, Germany, in May 1918, but was damaged in factory tests. The repaired first prototype, which had new wings and ailerons, was tested until September 1918.

Specifications (D.I)

References

Further reading
 

1910s German fighter aircraft
Military aircraft of World War I
Aircraft first flown in 1918